The Vanil Carré (or Pra de Cray) is a mountain in the western Bernese Alps, located on the border between the cantons of Fribourg and Vaud. It lies on the massif separating the valleys of Gruyère and Pays d'Enhaut, which culminates at the Vanil Noir.

References

Mountains of the Alps
Mountains of Switzerland
Mountains of the canton of Fribourg
Mountains of the canton of Vaud
Fribourg–Vaud border
Two-thousanders of Switzerland